Rope climbing was an artistic gymnastics event held at the Summer Olympics.  It was only held four times: 1896, 1904, 1924, and 1932.

Medalists

Team medal counts

References 

Rope climbing